Živko Slijepčević (born 19 August 1957) is a Serbian football manager and former player.

He played for FK Preporod Novi Žednik, FK Spartak Subotica, Quimper Cornouaille FC, Valenciennes FC and Trélissac FC. Currently working as a coach of French Trélissac FC.

Playing career

Club
Born in Gerzovo, SR Bosnia and Herzegovina, he grew up in northern Serbia, in a town of Novi Žednik, near Subotica. There he made his first football steps at local club FK Preporod Novi Žednik, where he competed in a lower league. His talent was noticed by the people from FK Spartak Subotica who brought him to the club in 1968. He will play for Spartak for the following 20 years. He became a senior in 1975, and with the exception of the second half of the 1984–85 season, which he spent on loan with FK Trepča, he will play with Spartak in the Yugoslav Second League until 1998.

After a long stay in Subotica, he went to France, where he still lives and works. There, as a player he represented clubs, and also three as a coach. The longest club he played for, was the one he trains nowadays, Trélissac FC. In the season 1992/93 he played with Valenciennes FC in the Ligue 1.

Managerial career
By the end of his playing career, he already became a player/coach during the last two seasons with Trélissac FC. Later, he was the head coach head of other French clubs such as Notron, US Concarneau, US Avranches, and Trélissac FC again.

Honours
 Vice-champion of Ligue 2 in 1992 with Valenciennes FC

References

External links
 Sports sector at Trélissac FC official site
 Živko Slijepčević at Sudouest.fr

1957 births
Living people
People from Mrkonjić Grad
Serbs of Bosnia and Herzegovina
Association football midfielders
Yugoslav footballers
Bosnia and Herzegovina footballers
FK Spartak Subotica players
FK Trepča players
Valenciennes FC players
Quimper Kerfeunteun F.C. players
Trélissac FC players
Ligue 1 players
Ligue 2 players
Yugoslav expatriate footballers
Bosnia and Herzegovina expatriate footballers
Expatriate footballers in France
Yugoslav expatriate sportspeople in France
Bosnia and Herzegovina expatriate sportspeople in France
Bosnia and Herzegovina football managers
Serbian football managers
Bosnia and Herzegovina expatriate football managers
Expatriate football managers in France